Recurvaria stibomorpha is a moth of the family Gelechiidae. It is found in North America, where it has been recorded from Ontario.

The wingspan is 9–10 mm. The forewings are white irregularly speckled grey and with a dark grey spot on the costa near the base, a black dot beneath the fold at one-fourth, and some grey suffusion between these. There is some grey suffusion and two or three black scales towards the base of the dorsum, as well as a dark grey spot on the costa at two-fifths. A short longitudinal dark grey streak is found in the middle of the disc with two black marks representing the discal stigmata, the plical stigma black, hardly before the anterior end of this. There is a dark grey blotch becoming blackish towards the costa at two-thirds and a small blackish spot above the tornus, with grey tornal suffusion and some grey apical suffusion, with scattered black scales. The hindwings are light grey.

References

Moths described in 1929
Recurvaria
Moths of North America